Nyzhnie Synovydne is a village (selo) in Stryi Raion, Lviv Oblast, of Western Ukraine. It belongs to Skole urban hromada, one of the hromadas of Ukraine. The population of the village is about 1,113 people and Local government is administered by Nyzhnosynovydnenska village council.

Geography 
The village is located in the river valley where the two rivers merge into one — Stryi River and Opir River.
Area of the village totals is 1,63 km2 and is located along the Highway M06 (Ukraine).

History 
The village is known from the 13th century, although the official founding date of village is 1691.
In ancient times through the village was a trade route from Kievan Rus' to Hungary.

Until 18 July 2020, Nyzhnie Synovydne belonged to Skole Raion. The raion was abolished in July 2020 as part of the administrative reform of Ukraine, which reduced the number of raions of Lviv Oblast to seven. The area of Skole Raion was merged into Stryi Raion.

Attractions 
The village has two sights of architecture Skole district:
 Assumption of the Virgin Mary church (wood, 1803) (1416 / 1)
 Assumption of the Virgin Mary church bell tower 18th century (wood). (1416 / 2)

Gallery

References

External links 
 Населенні пункти Сколівського району  -  Нижнє Синьовидне 
 village Nyzhnie Synovydne
 weather.in.ua

Literature 
  Page 717

Villages in Stryi Raion